The borough of Hastings, one of six local government districts in the English county of East Sussex, has 50 extant places of worship serving a wide range of religious denominations.  A further 29 buildings formerly used for public worship, but now closed or used for other purposes, also exist.  The borough is made up of the ancient port and seaside resort of Hastings, the neighbouring planned resort of St Leonards-on-Sea (united with its former rival in 1888) and their 19th- and 20th-century suburbs, some of which (such as Ore and Hollington) were autonomous villages until they were absorbed into the growing urban area.  Ancient churches existed in the Old Town of Hastings and in the villages, although some were lost in the medieval era; growth stimulated by transport improvements and the popularity of sea bathing encouraged a rush of church-building in the Victorian era; and more churches and congregations were established throughout the 20th century, despite periods of stagnation and decline.

A majority of residents of Hastings identify themselves as Christian, and churches representing many Christian denominations exist in the town.  The largest number of these belong to the Church of England, the country's officially established church. Roman Catholic and Protestant Nonconformist churches of many types are also prevalent, and St Leonards-on-Sea has a mosque.  The spread of housing inland in the 20th century, in suburbs such as Silverhill Park, Broomgrove and the vastly expanded Hollington (which was transformed from a haphazard collection of cottages among fields into a 1960s council estate), resulted in the founding of new churches, partly offsetting the loss through demolition of others in Hastings town centre.

Historic England or its predecessor English Heritage have awarded listed status to 25 current and former church buildings in Hastings.  A building is defined as "listed" when it is placed on a statutory register of buildings of "special architectural or historic interest" in accordance with the Planning (Listed Buildings and Conservation Areas) Act 1990.  The Department for Digital, Culture, Media and Sport, a Government department, is responsible for this; Historic England, a non-departmental public body, acts as an agency of the department to administer the process and advise the department on relevant issues.  There are three grades of listing status. Grade I, the highest, is defined as being of "exceptional interest"; Grade II* is used for "particularly important buildings of more than special interest"; and Grade II, the lowest, is used for buildings of "special interest".

Overview of Hastings and its places of worship

Hastings is a seaside town on the southeast coast of England, facing the English Channel. Hastings is most famous for the battle fought nearby in 1066, in which William the Conqueror's Norman army defeated the English troops of King Harold II, but its recorded history is much longer: fifth-century origins have been attributed, Roman settlement on the site has never been proved but is considered likely, and a town had developed by 928, when it was important enough to have its own mint. By the 12th century, it was the main member of the Cinque Ports, and its castle dominated the cliff below which the ancient settlement developed. There were seven churches in 1291, when Pope Nicholas IV ordered a survey of all places of worship in England, but decline set in during the 14th century and two French raids wrecked the town. By 1801, just two of the old churches—All Saints and St Clement's—survived.

The common thread throughout the town's history has been fishing: in 1329 a priest was threatened with excommunication for failing to pay the Bishop of Chichester the 2,000 herring demanded by custom, and a beach-based fishing fleet still exists in the 21st century.  The fishermen even had their own church from 1854 until World War II: the rectors of All Saints and St Clement's got together to provide a chapel of ease on the beach to serve their spiritual needs.  The former St Nicholas' Church is now Hastings Fishermen's Museum.  The town's focus moved away from this industry and towards tourism and leisure from the early 19th century, though, as development spread west from the old town.  Improved transport opened the town up to day-trippers, especially from London; sea-bathing, promenading and other seaside leisure activities became increasingly fashionable; and James Burton capitalised on the demand for growth by founding an entirely new town, St Leonards-on-Sea, immediately west of Hastings—spurring its older rival into further growth.  The population rose from 2,982 to 6,051 between 1801 and 1821, and the need to build more churches was recognised.  In 1824, St Mary-in-the-Castle Church, which took its dedication from a ruined collegiate church in the castle grounds, was the first new Anglican church to be built outside Hastings Old Town.  Development was so rapid that Holy Trinity Church, the second town church in Hastings, had to be crowded into a "crazy site" when it was built in the 1850s.  St Leonards-on-Sea gained its first Anglican church, St Leonard's, in 1837, followed by St Mary Magdalen's Church in 1852.  Rapid population growth continued throughout the 19th century: for example, the 1871 census recorded 29,289 residents, and there were 65,528 in 1901.  In response to this, 27 churches were built in Hastings and St Leonards-on-Sea in the second half of the century.  Some were intended for high-class, fashionable visitors and residents; others were developed "with missionary zeal to bring some hope of redemption to working-class areas".

In 1897, an Act of Parliament brought several surrounding villages into the borough of Hastings; nine years earlier the same had happened to St Leonards-on-Sea.  Places such as Ore and Hollington had become suburbanised but retained ancient churches as well as gaining new ones: Ore's 12th-century St Helen's Church was ruined in the 19th century, but a replacement was built nearby and a second, Christ Church (distinguished by the "very naughty turret" on its roof), was provided to serve the village's Victorian suburbs; and Hollington's 13th-century church in the middle of a wood was later supplemented by a second Anglican church after the scattered village was redeveloped into Hastings' largest council estate.

Organised worship by the Roman Catholic community dates back to 1848, when the now disused St Michael's Chapel in St Leonards-on-Sea was opened for public use.  Permanent churches were opened in both Hastings and St Leonards-on-Sea in the 1880s: at Hastings, the very tall, complex Free Gothic Revival St Mary Star of the Sea Church (1881–83, by Basil Champneys) was partly funded by poet Coventry Patmore while the much more austere Church of St Thomas of Canterbury and English Martyrs, St Leonards-on-Sea (1888–89, by Charles Alban Buckler) replaced an earlier building by the same architect which had been destroyed by fire in 1887.  Hollington's 20th-century growth prompted the construction of the Church of the Holy Redeemer in 1934 and its major extension 50 years later.  In the suburbs, a convent chapel built in 1924 was used for public worship in Clive Vale for a time (the last regular public Masses were celebrated in 1988), and two permanent churches were built.  In 1963, a chapel of ease to St Mary, Star of the Sea was registered in Ore, followed by an additional church in Bulverhythe the next year.  Both have now closed: the Church of the Holy Ghost at Bulverhythe, latterly served from St Leonards-on-Sea, was closed in 1988 and deregistered the following year, while the Church of the Holy Apostles at Ore went out of use in 1994.

The borough has an array of Nonconformist places of worship. Protestant Dissenters were not universally welcomed at first: the town's first Congregational chapel, planned in 1807, had to be built in London and taken to the town by sea because no local firm wanted to build it.  The weatherboarded chapel's successor survived until 1972.  Other early chapels were built for Baptists: Ebenezer Chapel was established in 1817 (it is now a house, but the congregation has moved to another building) and another opened on Wellington Square for General Baptists in 1838.  Residents of St Leonards-on-Sea have been served by St Leonard's Baptist Church since 1882, and a church was registered in Halton in 1957.  The early Congregational chapel, situated in the old town, was supplemented by churches at Robertson Street (1856; rebuilt 1884–85), St Leonards-on-Sea (1863), Mount Pleasant Road at Blacklands (1878–79), Clive Vale (1887) and Bulverhythe (1895).  All of these joined the United Reformed Church upon its formation in 1972 except St Leonards-on-Sea: this instead became a Congregational Federation church, but it closed in the early 21st century.  Clive Vale United Reformed Church is still open, as is the 1970s successor (St Mark's) to the chapel at Blacklands; Robertson Street is now a Pentecostal church; and Bulverhythe is in secular use as a hall.  The United Reformed Church was formed by a merger between the Congregational Church and Presbyterian Church of England, and the latter's St Luke's Church (1857) remains in use.

The Methodist Statistical Returns published in 1947 recorded the existence of eight Methodist chapels in Hastings and St Leonards-on-Sea, all but one of which were of Wesleyan origin.  At that time, the Hastings Circuit was responsible for Central Methodist Church, a 750-capacity building in the town centre, and outlying chapels in the Old Town (Wesley Chapel; capacity 268 worshippers), Halton (the Calvert Memorial Church; 500), Hollington (300) and Ore (St Helen's Methodist Church; 220).  The St Leonards and Bexhill Circuit was responsible for former Wesleyan chapels at Norman Road and Park Road (with space for 550 and 450 worshippers respectively) and a chapel on Newgate Road (150) which was originally Primitive Methodist.  Of these, only the Calvert Memorial and Park Road churches remain open. William Willmer Pocock's Central Methodist Church of 1875, on a "distinctive corner site", was demolished in 1980.  Bourne Street is now in commercial use, the church on Norman Road went out of religious use in 2008, Hollington closed in 2016 and merged with Park Road Church to form the present St Leonards Methodist Church, and St Helen's Methodist Church at Ore shut in the same year and its congregation now worship in a community centre.  The former Primitive Methodist chapel was the earliest closure, being converted into a hall for secular use in 1939.

Various Brethren groups have been prominent since the early 20th century.  Rainbow Hall in Silverhill (registered in 1930) was succeeded in 1962 by the present Alexandra Chapel for Christian (Open) Brethren. The former Gospel hall at Castle Hill Road no longer exists, but another on Stonefield Road (registered for marriages in 1947) remains, although no longer in religious use.  Brethren in St Leonards-on-Sea met in hired rooms in Cross Street before moving to a Gospel hall on Norman Road by 1935 and then to a new building, the Ponswood Road Room, in 1953 (this building is now Ebenezer Baptist Church).  A meeting room (no longer extant) was also registered on Stockleigh Road in 1966.  The Plymouth Brethren Christian Church sect use a meeting room (1972) off the Battle Road.

Many other religious groups are represented in the borough. Quakers and Unitarians meet in buildings a short distance apart on South Terrace: the Quaker meeting house dates from 1864, while the Unitarian church was built three years later and opened in 1868. The Salvation Army have met nearby since the 1880s; their citadel was enlarged in 1937, two years after a second was opened in a converted cinema in Ore.  Places of worship for Spiritualists and Seventh-day Adventists were registered in 1944 and 1968 respectively.  For Jehovah's Witnesses, Kingdom Halls were registered in St Leonards-on-Sea in 1976 (no longer in use), Hollington in 1988 and Ore in 2007.  An Elim Pentecostal church was registered in 1981, the His Place Community Church—an independent Pentecostal group founded in 1984—now use the former United Reformed church in Robertson Street, and the Bethel Full Gospel Church (Assemblies of God Pentecostal) has occupied a building in Halton since 2003. Latter-day Saints and Christian Scientists registered buildings in Hollington and Silverhill respectively in 1970; the former was replaced by a permanent meetinghouse in 1990, while the First Church of Christ, Scientist, Hastings and St Leonards-on-Sea was dissolved in 1996 and the building is in alternative use. Evangelical and non-denominational churches include The Tabernacle (1854), The Independent Church (formerly Kenilworth Evangelical Mission; registered 1977) The King's Church (registered 1995) and Sonrise Church, which occupies a former Anglican church building; another redundant Anglican church was converted into St Mary Magdalene's Greek Orthodox Church in the early 1980s. Muslims converted a building in St Leonards-on-Sea into a mosque and community centre in the 1980s.

Religious affiliation
According to the 2011 United Kingdom Census, 90,254 people lived in Hastings.  Of these, 51.89% identified themselves as Christian, 1.28% were Muslim, 0.53% were Buddhist, 0.47% were Hindu, 0.16% were Jewish, 0.04% were Sikh, 0.74% followed another religion, 36.64% claimed no religious affiliation and 8.26% did not state their religion.  The proportion of Christians was lower than that of England as a whole (59.38%), while affiliation with Buddhism and faiths in the "any other religion" category was more widespread in Hastings: the corresponding figures for England were 0.45% and 0.43% respectively.  The proportion of people with no religious affiliation was also higher than the national figure of 24.74%.  The other religions had much lower proportions of followers than in England overall: the corresponding national percentages were 5.02% for Islam, 1.52% for Hinduism, 0.79% for Sikhism and 0.49% for Judaism.

Administration
All Anglican churches in Rother district are part of the Diocese of Chichester, whose cathedral is at Chichester, and the Lewes and Hastings Archdeaconry—one of three subdivisions which make up the next highest level of administration. In turn, this archdeaconry is divided into eight deaneries.  One of these, the Rural Deanery of Hastings, covers the whole borough and includes all 16 open Anglican churches.  St Leonard's Church at St Leonards-on-Sea and All Souls Church at Clive Vale, both closed in the early 21st century, were also part of this Rural Deanery.

The Roman Catholic Diocese of Arundel and Brighton, whose cathedral is at Arundel, administers the borough's three Roman Catholic churches.  All three—St Mary Star of the Sea at Hastings, St Thomas of Canterbury and the English Martyrs at St Leonards-on-Sea and the Church of the Holy Redeemer at Hollington—are part the of Eastbourne and St Leonards-on-Sea Deanery, one of 11 deaneries in the diocese.  The churches at St Leonards-on-Sea and Hollington are part of a joint parish.

The four United Reformed Churches in the borough as of 2011, at Robertson Street (now closed), Clive Vale, Silverhill and St Mark's, were part of the West Kent and East Sussex Synod Area of the Church—a group of 32 churches within the Southern Synod region.

The Hastings, Bexhill & Rye Methodist Circuit, a circuit in the Methodist Church's South East District, covers 12 churches of that denomination in the Hastings area.  Three of those are in the borough: the Calvert Memorial church at Halton, the church at St Helen's (now housed in Ore Community Centre following the closure of the chapel building in 2016), and the former Park Road Church in Bohemia (now called St Leonards-on-Sea Methodist Church).

Current places of worship

Former places of worship

See also

List of demolished places of worship in East Sussex

Notes

References

Bibliography

 (Available online in 14 parts; Guide to abbreviations on page 6)

Hastings
 Hastings
Hastings
Worship places
 
Lists of buildings and structures in East Sussex